Riedel is a German surname. Notable people with the surname include: 

 Adolph Friedrich Johann Riedel (1809-1872), German industrialist and politician
August Riedel (Johann Friedrich Ludwig Heinrich August Riedel) (1799–1883), German painter
Bruce Riedel (born c. 1953), U.S. foreign policy analyst and author
Eberhard Riedel (born 1938), German former alpine skier
Georg Riedel (Altstadt Kantor) (1676-1738), German composer
Georg Riedel (Swedish jazz musician) (born 1934), Czech-born Swedish musician
Hermann Riedel (1847–1913), German composer
Klaus Riedel (1907-1944), German engineer 
Lars Riedel (born 1967), German discus thrower 
Ludwig Riedel (1790-1861), German botanist 
Oliver Riedel (born 1971), German musician
Ryszard Riedel (1956-1994), Polish blues singer and author of many songs of group Dzem
Walter Riedel (1902-1968), German engineer
Antje Göhler (born Riedel, 1967), German chess master and writer

See also
Riedel's thyroiditis, a disease
Riedel (glass manufacturer)
Riedel Communications, A company for real-time networks for video, audio, data & communications.
Riedel (crater), a moon crater

German-language surnames
Surnames from given names